"Hold You" is a song by German DJ ATB, released as the second single from his third studio album Dedicated (2002). It features Roberta Carter Harrison of the band  Wild Strawberries on vocals. It became a top 20 hit in Germany, Hungary and Romania.

CD single track listings

Hold You (Germany Release) 
 "Hold You" (Airplay Mix) 3:28
 "Hold You" (Clubb Mix 1) 7:13
 "Hold You" (Clubb Mix 2) 7:25
 "Hold You" (M.O.R.P.H. Mix) 7:59
 "Hold You" (Ratty Mix) 6:51

Hold You (US Release) 
 "Hold You" (Airplay Mix) 3:28
 "Hold You" (Tee's Radio Edit) 3:56
 "Hold You" (Clubb Mix 2) 7:25
 "Hold You" (Tee's Extended Mix) 7:59
 "Hold You" (Ratty Mix) 6:51
 "Hold You" (JN Remix Radio Edit) 4:13
 "Hold You" (Clubb Mix 1) 7:13

Hold You (Netherlands Release) 
 "Hold You" (Airplay Mix) 3:31
 "Hold You" (Clubb Mix 1) 7:19
 "Hold You" (Clubb Mix 2) 7:25
 "Hold You" (Svenson & Gielen Remix) 6:34
 "Hold You" (M.O.R.P.H. Mix) 7:59
 "Hold You" (Ratty Mix) 6:51

Hold You (Spain Release) 
 "Hold You" (Airplay Mix) 3:29
 "Hold You" (Clubb Mix 2) 7:26
 "Hold You" (Clubb Mix 1) 7:14
 "Let U Go" (Clubb Mix) 8:18
 "Let U Go" (Wippenberg Remix) 6:38
 "Let U Go" (ATB Remix) 7:03
 "Let U Go" (UK Dub Mix) 5:48
 "Hold You" (M.O.R.P.H. Mix) 7:59
 "Hold You" (Ratty Mix) 6:51

Charts

References

2001 singles
ATB songs
Songs written by André Tanneberger
2001 songs